is a gravity dam on the Tadami River in Kaneyama, Fukushima Prefecture, Japan. It was constructed between 1952 and 1954 for the purpose of hydroelectric power generation. It supplies a 78 MW power station with water.

See also

Uwada Dam – located downstream
Taki Dam – located upstream

References

Dams in Fukushima Prefecture
Hydroelectric power stations in Japan
Dams completed in 1954
Dams on the Tadami River
Energy infrastructure completed in 1954
Gravity dams
1954 establishments in Japan